Rail Link (26 March 2003 – 20 May 2022) was a thoroughbred racehorse best known for winning the Prix de l'Arc de Triomphe in 2006.

Background
Rail Link was trained by André Fabre, and was ridden by jockey Christophe Soumillon  or Stéphane Pasquier for owner Khalid Abdullah.

Racing career
Unraced at two, he made an inauspicious start to his three-year-old career, unseating his rider on his debut at Saint-Cloud, and then finishing second in its next race at Chantilly Racecourse. From then on he was undefeated in five races, winning the Prix Gouvernant, Prix du Lys, Grand Prix de Paris and Prix Niel.

On 1 October 2006 he won the 85th Prix de l'Arc de Triomphe, defeating Pride, Deep Impact, Shirocco, and Hurricane Run.

During the Winter of 2006–7, he suffered a tendon problem and was taken out of training. He was expected to return in the Summer of 2007, but the injury was too serious and he was retired from racing. He was sent to stud at Juddmonte Farms.

Pedigree

References

2003 racehorse births
2022 racehorse deaths
Racehorses bred in the United Kingdom
Racehorses trained in France
Arc winners
Thoroughbred family 13-c